College Heights is a former hamlet located within the City of Lacombe that is home to the Burman University.

Prior to 2000, College Heights was recognized by Alberta Municipal Affairs as a hamlet under the jurisdiction of Lacombe County.  However, its hamlet designation ceased in 2000 when it and other Lacombe County lands were absorbed by Lacombe via an annexation approved by the Province of Alberta on April 12, 2000, with a retroactive effective date of January 1, 2000.

References 

Former hamlets in Alberta
Lacombe, Alberta